Nelson Mario Pons Seelig (born 18 December 1967) is an Ecuadorian former cyclist. He competed at the 1988 Summer Olympics and the 1992 Summer Olympics.

References

External links
 

1967 births
Living people
Ecuadorian male cyclists
Olympic cyclists of Ecuador
Cyclists at the 1988 Summer Olympics
Cyclists at the 1992 Summer Olympics
Cyclists from Buenos Aires